"Bitch" (censored to "B*tch" and "Trick") is a single by American rapper E-40 off his twelfth studio album Revenue Retrievin': Day Shift. The song features fellow West Coast American rapper and former label mate Too Short. The single is the only charting single of the Revenue Retrievin' series. The song receives airplay in the mix on radio stations such as Power 106 in Los Angeles. A popular remix was made also featuring 50 Cent who is featured on the single cover.

Background 
In Too Short's verse he points out what makes a man a "B I T C H" and E-40 discusses what makes a woman a "bitch."

Music video 
The music video was released via E-40's official YouTube account on March 11, 2010. In the video Too $hort and E-40 travel through green screen houses and malls, deconstructing the concept of being a "bitch."

Remix 
The official remix features American rapper 50 Cent and was officially released via his YouTube channel.

Charts

References 

2010 songs
E-40 songs
Too Short songs
50 Cent songs
Gangsta rap songs
Songs written by E-40
Songs written by 50 Cent
Songs written by Too Short
Jive Records singles